John H. Bailey (September 22, 1864 – August 27, 1940) was a senator and a representative from the state of Texas.

Life
John H. Bailey was born on September 22, 1864 to Luther Rice Bailey (May 3, 1837- April 28, 1918) and Mary Ellen Crank (1842-1920), one of their nine children. He never married and did not have any children.

Politics
He first was a Texas representative from the 24th-26th sessions (about 6 years). And then served as a Texas Senator from the 34th-39th sessions (15 years 5 months).

References

1864 births
1940 deaths
Texas state senators
Members of the Texas House of Representatives